A "pearl necklace" is slang for a sexual act in which a man ejaculates semen on or near the neck, chest, or breast of another person. The term originates from the way the deposited semen resembles a necklace of translucent white pearls.

Receiving a pearl necklace is an activity that sex workers use as a safe sex alternative for people who prefer not to wear condoms.

In popular culture
George Carlin used the term in his "Incomplete List of Impolite Words" joke as early as 1984, on the album Carlin on Campus. The term was also used in the stoner comedy Half Baked (1996). The ZZ Top song "Pearl Necklace" drew attention for its lyrics which were alleged to objectify women. The term appears in episode 69 of the HBO sex comedy Sex and the City, first broadcast in 2004.

See also

 Bukkake
 Cum shot
 Facial
 Money shot
 Snowballing (sexual practice)

References

Sexual acts
Sexual slang
Pornography terminology
Ejaculation
Metaphors referring to objects